The 2007 Peak Antifreeze Indy 300 was a race in the 2007 IRL IndyCar Series, held at Chicagoland Speedway. It was held over the weekend of 7 -September 9, 2007, as the seventeenth and final round of the 2007 calendar.

Dario Franchitti secured the title after title rival Scott Dixon ran out of fuel in turn 3 of on the final lap, some 800 metres shy of the finsh fine. After this race, Franchitti moved on to the NASCAR Sprint Cup Series, meaning that for the first time in IRL history, a champion would not defend his title in the following season. Franchitti returned to IndyCar in 2009 and would go on to win three straight Indycar championships from 2009 to 2011 and two Indy 500s in 2010 and 2012. Before he retired following a crash in the second race of the 2013 Shell-Pennzoil Grand Prix of Houston.

Another notable farewell was 2006 Indy 500 winner & three time Indy Racing League champion Sam Hornish Jr. as he would also move in 2008 to the NASCAR Sprint Cup Series with Team Penske. Unlike Franchitti, Hornish never came back to IndyCar since then.

Classification

References 
IndyCar Series

Peak Antifreeze Indy 300
Chicagoland Indy 300
Peak Antifreeze Indy 300
Peak Antifreeze Indy 300